Odalasvir (INN, previously known as ACH-3102) is an investigational new drug in development for the treatment of hepatitis C.  It is an NS5A inhibitor. The NS5A protein serves multiple functions at various stages of the viral life cycle, including viral replication. NS5A also plays a role in the development of interferon-resistance, a common cause of treatment failure. It is under development by Achillion Pharmaceuticals.

See also
 Discovery and development of NS5A inhibitors

References

Benzimidazoles
Carbamates
NS5A inhibitors
Experimental drugs
Cyclophanes